Kinetta is a 2005 Greek experimental psychological drama film produced by Athina Rachel Tsangari and directed by Yorgos Lanthimos. It is Lanthimos' solo directorial debut. It was written by Yorgos Lanthimos and Yorgos Kakanakis. It stars Evangelia Randou, Aris Servetalis, and Costas Xikominos.

Plot
During off-season at the Greek seaside resort of Kinetta, three perfect strangers—a police officer out of uniform with a thing for German luxury cars and Russian women, an eccentric photographer, and a hotel chambermaid—join forces for a rather strange reason: to recreate homicides. Meticulously and with an almost ritualistic approach, the unlikely trio reenact crime scenes of brutal murders, to the point where the boundaries of their own private lives slowly begin to blur.

Reception
John DeFore, writing for The Hollywood Reporter, praised the movie's ability to provoke its audience, with the intrusion of humorous shots or moments of color into the otherwise "drearily wintry" aesthetic. He also asserted longtime fans would enjoy the movie, as it "...introduces themes that would continue even into his lauded English-language work."

Release
The film was not released theatrically in the United States in 2005. In 2019, the Museum of the Moving Image played the film for nine days in October.

Cast
 Evangelia Randou
 Aris Servetalis 
 Costas Xikominos
 Youlika Skafida
 Hector Kaloudis

References

External links

2005 films
2005 drama films
2000s psychological drama films
Films set in Greece
2000s Greek-language films
Greek drama films
Films directed by Yorgos Lanthimos

Greek avant-garde and experimental films